The Miles M.33 Monitor was a twin-engined British target tug aircraft designed and built by Miles Aircraft towards the end of the Second World War. Intended for use by the Royal Air Force and the Fleet Air Arm, the aircraft did not enter service with either.

Design and development

The Monitor came about as a response to Specification Q9/42 for a twin-engined high-speed target tug for the Royal Air Force. Two prototypes were ordered; the first prototype (Serial Number NF900) first flew on 5 April 1944, and was capable of reaching .

The Monitor was a high-winged aircraft with an all-metal fuselage and wooden wings. It was originally stipulated that the aircraft would incorporate the Bristol Beaufighter wing and landing gear to speed up design and production, but owing to increased demand for the Beaufighter only the landing gear was used, and a new all-wood one-piece wing was designed. The aircraft was powered by two Wright Cyclone R-2600-31 radial engines driving Hamilton Standard Hydromatic propellers.

The original requirement for a target towing aircraft for the RAF was abandoned, and the orders for Monitors was taken over by the Fleet Air Arm, who required an aircraft capable of simulating dive-bombing attacks on warships. To meet this requirement the aircraft, fitted  with hydraulically actuated dive brakes, nose cameras for marking Fleet gunnery,  a dorsal midship cupola and radar equipment was used to accurately determine height was known as the Monitor TT Mk II.

Spare targets were stowed on board and could be changed in flight, while winged targets were towed off the ground on a  line.

At the end of the war, contracts for 600 Monitors were cancelled, only 20 in total were built. As with all aircraft for service use, the Monitor was evaluated by the Aeroplane and Armament Experimental Establishment (A&AEE) at RAF Boscombe Down.

The first received at the A&AEE (NF900) caught fire during a landing in August 1944 killing one crew member, the second prototype (NF904) made a wheels up landing at the A&AEE in August 1945, and NP409 on Intensive Flying crashed into the sea in August 1945 killing both crew.

None entered service and all survivors were scrapped.

Variants
Monitor TT Mk I
Prototype target tug for the Royal Air Force, one built.
Monitor TT Mk II
Target tug for the Fleet Air Arm, one prototype and 20 production aircraft.

Specifications (TT.Mk.2)

See also

References

Notes

Bibliography

 Amos, Peter. and Brown, Don Lambert. Miles Aircraft Since 1925, Volume 1. London: Putnam Aeronautical, 2000. .
 Bridgman, L, (ed.) (1998) Jane's fighting aircraft of World War II. Crescent. .
 Mason, Tim. The Secret Years: Flight Testing at Boscombe Down, 1939-1945. Crowborough, UK: Hikoki Publications, 2010. .
 Mondey, David. The Hamlyn Concise guide to British Aircraft of World War II. London: Chancellor press, 2002. .
 Sturivant, Ray. Fleet Air Arm Fixed-Wing Aircraft since 1946. Tonbridge, Kent: Air-Britain, 2004. .
 Thetford, Owen. British Naval Aircraft since 1912 . London: Putnam, Fourth edition, 1978 .

External links

 Fleet Air Arm Archive
 Flight  The Miles Monitor First Target-towing Twin-engined Aircraft to be Specifically Designed for the Work 4 October 1945

1940s British military trainer aircraft
Monitor
High-wing aircraft
Aircraft first flown in 1944
Twin piston-engined tractor aircraft